The Cymru Premier, known as the JD Cymru Premier for sponsorship reasons, is the national football league of Wales. It has both professional and semi-professional status clubs and is at the top of the Welsh football league system. Prior to 2002, the league was known as the League of Wales (LoW), but changed its name as part of a sponsorship deal to the Welsh Premier League.  The league was rebranded as the Cymru Premier for the 2019–20 season.

Formation

Original League 
The league was formed in October 1991 by Alun Evans, Secretary General of the Football Association of Wales (FAW), as he believed that the Welsh international football team was under threat from FIFA. The FAW, along with the other three home nations' associations (The Football Association, Irish Football Association and Scottish Football Association), had a permanent seat on the International Football Association Board (IFAB) and it was thought that many FIFA members were resentful of this and pressing for the four unions to unite into one combined side for the whole of the United Kingdom.

The new league was formed for the 1992–93 season, and officially launched on 15 August 1992. At the time, despite the FAW being a FIFA and UEFA member it had not previously organised a national league, only the Welsh Cup. Traditionally, the strongest teams in Wales had always played in the English leagues. Aberdare Athletic, Cardiff City, Merthyr Town, Newport County, Swansea City and Wrexham have all been members of the Football League, while many other Welsh based clubs have competed in the Northern Premier League and Southern Football League.

Because of historically poor north–south transport links within Wales (although these have improved in the post World War II years), it was often easier for Welsh clubs to travel east–west, so Welsh clubs tended to look east to England for competitors and many of the top semi-professional sides in Wales played in the English football league system; Bangor City were founder members of the Alliance Premier League (now the National League) in 1979 and reached the FA Trophy final in 1984, before transferring to the new League of Wales in 1992.

Further recruitment 
The formation of the League of Wales saw the start of a bitter dispute between the Football Association of Wales (FAW) and those non-League clubs who wanted to remain part of the English football pyramid. The 'Irate Eight', as they were dubbed, consisted of Bangor City, Barry Town, Caernarfon Town, Colwyn Bay, Merthyr Tydfil, Newport, Newtown and Rhyl. At the time, Cardiff City, Swansea City and Wrexham were playing in The Football League, and the FAW decided to allow those teams to continue to play in the English system, although they continued to compete in the Welsh Cup for a few more seasons. The success of these clubs in the Welsh Cups meant that they frequently competed in the European Cup Winners' Cup despite the fact that Wrexham had never played above the Second Division and Swansea had spent just two seasons in the First Division during the early 1980s, while Cardiff had been semi-regular members of the First Division from the 1920s up to 1962.

Prior to the inaugural season, Bangor City, Newtown and Rhyl reluctantly agreed to play in the League of Wales. However, as Rhyl's application to join the league was late, they were placed in the second level of the pyramid system. Because of FAW sanctions, the remaining five clubs were forced to play their home matches in England. Following a season in exile at Worcester City, five became four, as Barry Town joined the Welsh pyramid in time for the 1993–94 season.

A court ruling in 1995 allowed the remaining four clubs to return to Wales to play their home matches while still remaining within the English system; despite this victory, Caernarfon Town decided to join the League of Wales for the 1995–96 season. Colwyn Bay continued in the English pyramid for a further 24 years before transferring to the Welsh pyramid in 2019, leaving only two of the Irate Eight remaining -  Newport County, who won promotion to the Football League in 2013, and Merthyr Town, the successor club to Merthyr Tydfil following its liquidation in 2010. In 2008, Wrexham were relegated from the Football League and more than 13 years later have still yet to return.

Conversely, in 1996 now-defunct English team Oswestry Town were accepted by the League of Wales and currently The New Saints are based in Oswestry (having moved from Llansantffraid, Powys in 2007). Another English club, Chester City, whose stadium sits on the England–Wales border, applied to join the Welsh Premier League after being expelled from the Football Conference in 2010 but were wound up almost immediately afterwards (their successor team, Chester F.C., opted to reapply within the English system).

Renewed calls to recruit Welsh teams 
Welsh football Teams that currently play in the English football system include: Cardiff City F.C. and Swansea City A.F.C (both in the EFL Championship), Newport County A.F.C (EFL League Two), Wrexham A.F.C. (National League) and Merthyr Town F.C. (Southern League Premier Division South).

Some have called for all Welsh teams to be recruited into Cymru Premier, but in particular the lower ranked teams Merthyr Town F.C. and Wrexham A.F.C. as they are both in the English non-league setup.

An online poll by "Y Clwb Peldroed' on Twitter found 56.7% in favour of Merthyr Town F.C. joining the Welsh football system.

Structure

Promotion and relegation
Clubs are promoted to the Cymru Premier from the Cymru North in the north/ central Wales and the Cymru South in the south/ central Wales. Clubs who finish as champions of the feeder leagues, or as runners-up if the champions decide not to seek promotion, are promoted subject to an application for membership being received and accepted and the stadium and infrastructure safety criteria of the Cymru Premier being met.

No teams were promoted to the Welsh Premier League following the 2005–06 season. However, Cardiff Grange Quins, who finished bottom of the Welsh Premier League resigned leaving the league to operate with an odd number of clubs for 2006–07.

Eighteen clubs competed in the Welsh Premier League for the 2007–08 season as both Neath Athletic (Welsh Football League Division One) and Llangefni Town (Cymru Alliance) were promoted whilst Cwmbran Town were relegated to Welsh Football League Division One.

For 2008–09, Prestatyn Town played in the Welsh Premier League for the first time after promotion from the Cymru Alliance, whilst Llangefni Town were relegated to the Cymru Alliance after only one season.

The 2009–10 season saw Bala Town promoted to the Welsh Premier League after they won the Cymru Alliance in 2008–09. They replaced Caernarfon Town who were relegated to the Cymru Alliance.

At the end of the 2009–10 season, due to league restructuring Connah's Quay, Porthmadog, Welshpool Town, Caersws and Cefn Druids were relegated to the Cymru Alliance league. Rhyl were also relegated to the Cymru Alliance, despite finishing 6th in the Welsh Premier League, as they failed to meet the financial criteria required to gain the Welsh Premier League domestic licence. No teams were promoted to the Welsh Premier League from the feeder leagues.

League restructure for 2010–11 season
The 18 Welsh Premier League clubs met on 13 April 2008 and voted to support a restructuring proposal put forward by Welsh Premier League secretary John Deakin which would replace the single Welsh Premier League with a First and Second Division with 10 teams in each Division for the 2010–11 season. A further proposal was accepted that the Football Association of Wales should take full control of the Welsh Premier League and the existing Company, 'Football League of Wales Limited' should be dissolved. These proposals were forwarded to the Football Association of Wales for their consideration.

In June 2009 the clubs voted to accept an alternative proposal to reduce the premier League from 18 clubs to 12 for the 2010–11 season onwards.

Current structure

The season is split into two phases, and concludes with an end of season Playoff to determine Wales' fourth European side for the following year.

Phase 1

Phase 1 runs from MD1 in August through to MD22 in mid-January. Each team plays the other sides in the league twice, once at home and once away, making a total of twenty-two games.

After the conclusion of Phase 1, the league splits in two, with the top six teams forming the Championship Conference, and the bottom six teams forming the Playoff Conference. All points accumulated by teams in Phase 1 are brought forward into Phase 2

Phase 2

Phase 2 then runs from MD23 at the start of February through to MD32 at the end of April. Each side plays the other five in their conference twice more, home and away, to bring up a total of thirty-two games played.

The side finishing top of the Championship Conference after thirty-two games is the League Champion, and will qualify for the UEFA Champions League. To date six teams have won the title in twenty-six seasons.

The Runners-Up in the Championship Conference qualify automatically for the UEFA Europa League, whilst the remaining teams qualify for the end of season European Playoffs.

The bottom two sides in the Playoff Conference are relegated. Meanwhile, the side finishing top of the Playoff Conference (seventh place in the league table) advances to the European Playoffs.

Note that sides in the Playoff Conference can finish no higher in the table than seventh.

European Playoffs

The five teams finishing in 3rd–7th contest the end of season European Playoffs. 6th host 7th in a Quarter-Final, with the winner travelling to the 3rd placed side for the first Semi-Final, whilst 4th host 5th in the other.

The winners then meet at the ground of the highest ranked side in the Final, with the winner qualifying for the UEFA Europa League.

If one of the five teams has already qualified for Europe by winning the JD Welsh Cup, then the remaining four sides will contest the Playoffs directly from the Semi-Final stage.

If one of the top two sides wins the JD Welsh Cup, then the third placed side will automatically take up a UEFA Europa League spot. The remaining four sides will then contest the Playoffs directly from the Semi-Final stage.

European competition
The champions of the Welsh Premier League qualify, along with the champions of every European domestic league, for the UEFA Champions League. The second placed team qualifies for the first qualifying round of the UEFA Europa League. The teams in places 3 to 7 then play-off for the second Europa spot.
A place in the second round of the Europa League is also awarded to the winners of the Welsh Cup. If the winners of the Welsh Cup have already qualified for Europe via their league placing (i.e., finishing in the top two and winning the Cup), or if the Welsh Cup winners have finished in a playoff position, then the remaining four sides contest the playoff.

Results in Europe have been mixed – some notable successes, such as Barry Town's run to the first round proper of the UEFA Cup, drawing 3–3 with Aberdeen at Jenner Park, Bangor City's win over FC Sartid of Yugoslavia and Barry's 3–1 victory over FC Porto in the UEFA Champions League (albeit losing 3–9 on aggregate), stand alongside some heavy defeats, such as The New Saints' 12–1 aggregate defeat to Amica Wronki of Poland.

As of June 2019 the Cymru Premier is ranked 46th out of 55 members by the UEFA coefficient.

Media coverage 
For the first four seasons of the league's existence, its results were not featured on the Press Association's vidiprinter service and consequently had not appeared on the BBC's Final Score or Sky's Soccer Saturday. The PA added the league's results at the start of the 1996–97 season, which was also when the PA began providing the results for the Northern Irish league.

The advent of the League has brought increased media coverage for its member clubs, notably from the Western Mail and Daily Post, as well as local press.

Since the start of the 2007–08 season goals and results from the league have appeared on the Press Association vidiprinter service. Prior to this only the full-time score had been displayed although the half time score had also been shown from around 2000. Both Final Score and Sports Report now include the Cymru Premier results as part of their classified football results sequence and for a while Soccer Saturday also included the WPL results but has not done so in recent seasons.

On television, brief highlights from one of the day's games were featured on BBC Wales' sports results programme Wales on Saturday whilst the BBC also provided a 30-minute highlights programme for Welsh-language broadcaster, S4C, entitled "Y Clwb Pêl-droed".  When the corporation lost the international broadcast rights to BSkyB at the end of the 2003/4 season, S4C won the secondary rights package which included highlights of the national team and all domestic rights. Sgorio took over the "Clwb Pêl-droed" slot previously produced by the BBC and in 2010/11 the half-hour highlights programme was dropped in favour of one live game per week. S4C broadcasts in Wales and throughout the rest of the UK via digital satellite with an interactive option for English-language commentary available via digital satellite.

As of the 2018/19 season, S4C show one live game per matchweek from either the league, Welsh Cup or Scottish Challenge Cup if a Welsh team is involved. They also stream all live televised matches on the Sgorio Facebook page, as well as streaming an additional ten per season from these competitions exclusively online.

Weekly highlights of all league games are shown on S4C on a Monday night at 17:30, and thereafter on Sgorio's social media and YouTube channels.

Clubs 

Of the 20 clubs that played in the inaugural season of the League of Wales, ten have since been relegated yet to return, with one, Ebbw Vale, folding in 1998. For a list of all clubs past and present see List of Cymru Premier clubs. For a list of winners and runners-up of the Cymru Premier since its inception, and top scorers for each season, see List of Welsh football champions.

Only two clubs have played in every season League of Wales/Cymru Premier since its inception. These two clubs are Aberystwyth Town and Newtown.

Sponsorship

Champions

For the champions of the top division of the Welsh League from 1904 to 1992, see Welsh Football League

Performances by club 
Seven clubs have been champions. In bold those competing in the 2021–22 season.

Notes:
The New Saints were known as Llansantffraid until 1996 and Total Network Solutions between then and 2006.

Players
Marc Lloyd Williams scored 319 goals in 467 appearances, making him the most prolific goalscorer in the league's history.

Colin Reynolds holds the record for the number of appearances in the league with 516 games played.

Paul Harrison holds the record for the most consecutive appearances in the league with more than 190

See also

Football in Wales
Welsh football league system
Welsh Cup
Welsh League Cup
FAW Premier Cup
List of association football competitions
List of football clubs in Wales
List of stadiums in Wales by capacity

References

External links
Official site of the JD Cymru Premier
Former Official site of the JD Cymru Premier
Welsh Football Data Archive website
SOCCERWAY (Welsh Premier League summary)

 
Wales
Sports leagues established in 1992
1992 establishments in Wales
Professional sports leagues in the United Kingdom